First National of Nebraska is an interstate bank holding company based in Omaha, Nebraska, United States.  Its largest banking subsidiary is First National Bank of Omaha.  First National of Nebraska ranks as one of the 50 largest banks in the United States.  There are locations in seven states and more than 6.6 million customers across the country.  First National of Nebraska and its affiliates have more than $20 billion in managed assets and 4320 employees.  As of June 30, 2009, First National of Nebraska had shareholders' equity of $1,116,225,000 with 315,000 shares outstanding and a Book Value Per Share of $3,544.

History

First National of Nebraska had its roots in the construction of First National Bank of Omaha's headquarters building, First National Center, in the 1960s.  It was determined that total expenses, including the $2.5 million already paid to Woodmen of the World and adjoining property owners for land, would come to $13.9 million.  It became necessary for First National to reorganize as a holding company due to statutory limitations on the amount of money a bank is allowed to invest in brick and mortar.  The U.S. Code draws the line at 50 percent of the financial institution's capital and surplus account. However, the investment in First National Center was equivalent, literally, to First National's entire net worth.  A parent corporation, acting technically in its own name and on its own behalf, can go ahead and incur a sizable debt for construction purposes without running afoul of federal law, as long as it owns at least 80 percent of its subsidiary's stock.  With that in mind, First National Bank's directors created (August 27, 1968) and its shareholders approved (January 21, 1969) First National of Nebraska, Inc.

Ownership
Bruce Lauritzen is Chairman of First National of Nebraska, Inc.  Lauritzen is also Chief Executive Officer of the Lauritzen Corporation, a financial and bank holding company owning additional banks in Nebraska and Iowa. The Lauritzen Corporation has an approximate 28% voting share in First National of Nebraska, Inc.

Board of directors
The Board of Directors is run by Clark Lauritzen, whose family owns a controlling interest in the Bank's ultimate holding company. The directors are family stockholders, independent directors, and members of the management of the Bank and its holding company.

Clark D. Lauritzen, President
Margaret Lauritzen Dodge
Roger A. Fleury
George J. Behringer
John W. Castle
Thomas C. Stokes
Bryan E. Slone

Banking subsidiaries

First National Bank Omaha

National business rankings
 Fifth-largest in-house credit card processor
 Top-ten commercial card issuer
 Eleventh-largest issuer of bank cards in the United States
 Top-twenty electronic funds processor
 Fifth-largest agricultural lender with customers in 49 states
 Largest commercial bank finance provider to the ethanol industry

Sponsorships
First National of Nebraska is a sponsor for the following:
Colorado State Rams (First National Bank of Omaha)
Creighton Bluejays (First National Bank of Omaha)
Nebraska Cornhuskers (First National Bank of Omaha-Bank of Husker Nation)
Northern Illinois University (First National Bank of Omaha)
UNO Mavericks (First National Bank of Omaha)

See also

Lauritzen Corporation (for information on banks and holdings of the Lauritzens not part of First National of Nebraska, Inc.)
FNBO Direct
First National Bank of Omaha

References

External links
 First National Bank Omaha Agent Issuing
 You Are Always First
 First National Equipment Financing has been merged with Diversified Financial Services, LLC in 2007. DFS is a Laurtizen company.

Banks based in Omaha, Nebraska
American companies established in 1968
Banks established in 1968
Privately held companies based in Nebraska
Kountze family